Nature of Love is the fourteenth studio album by Australian-born Irish singer and composer Johnny Logan, released in May 2010. The album includes Logan re-recording this two Eurovision Song Contest winning songs; "What's Another Year" and "Hold Me Now".

Reception
Kaja Schau Knatten from RB said "Logan's voice is flexible, well-controlled and rich in top, middle and bottom range" on "this collection of ballads". Knatten praised "Shame on You" for its rockier sound.

Track listing

Charts

References

Johnny Logan (singer) albums
2010 albums